Schinia vacciniae is a moth of the family Noctuidae. It is found in North America, including the U.S. states of Arizona, California, Idaho, Oregon and Washington.

The wingspan is about 19 mm.

External links
Images
Butterflies and Moths of North America

Schinia
Moths of North America
Moths described in 1875